Colonel Yehuda Levy served as the president and publisher of the Israeli English daily newspaper The Jerusalem Post.

Overview
Levy served as a Jewish National Fund emissary in Vancouver, Canada, where he befriended Hollinger president David Radler. After representing Hollinger during its purchase of The Jerusalem Post from Koor and Bank Hapoalim in 1989, Levy was appointed the paper's president and publisher, posts he held until 1997. In that time, Yehuda Levy turned the Jerusalem Post into a profitable company and raised the circulation of its titles. Following his retirement from the Post, Levy helped found Makor Rishon, a Hebrew weekly. He served as its editor and general manager during its first year of operation. Before his work at the Jewish National Fund, he served 25 years in the Israeli Defense Forces.

Levy died in his sleep at the age of 64 in Jerusalem on January 26, 2000.

References

Israeli publishers (people)
1930s births
2000 deaths